Kasim Uddin Ahmed is a Bangladesh Awami League politician and the former Member of Parliament of Bogra-2.

Career
Ahmed was the General Secretary of Inland Water Transport Workers Union in 1956. He was elected to parliament from Bogra-2 as a Bangladesh Awami League candidate in 1973.

References

Awami League politicians
Living people
1st Jatiya Sangsad members
Year of birth missing (living people)